Lee Jeong-beom (born September 21, 1971) is a South Korean film director and screenwriter. He is best known for such films as Cruel Winter Blues (2006) and The Man from Nowhere (2010).

Filmography
Jo Pil-ho: The Dawning Rage (2019) – director, screenplay
No Tears for the Dead (2014) - director, screenplay
Hoya  (2011) - cameo
The Man from Nowhere (2010) - director, screenplay
Cruel Winter Blues (2006) - director, screenplay
Goodbye Day (short film, 2003) - director, screenplay, editor
The Last Night (short film, 2002) - PD
Gwihyu (short film, 2001) - director, screenplay, editor

Awards
2011 8th Max Movie Awards: Best Director (The Man from Nowhere)
2010 6th University Film Festival of Korea: Best Director (The Man from Nowhere)
2007 15th Chunsa Film Art Awards: Best New Director (Cruel Winter Blues)

References

External links

South Korean film directors
South Korean screenwriters
Korea National University of Arts alumni
Living people
1971 births